Peter James Webb (born 2 October 1940) is a British rower. Webb competed for Great Britain in the 1964 Olympics in Tokyo. He rowed with Arnold Cooke in the men's double sculls, finishing in seventh place.

References

External links 
 

1940 births
Living people
British male rowers
Rowers at the 1964 Summer Olympics
Olympic rowers of Great Britain
People educated at Monkton Combe School
European Rowing Championships medalists